Jean de Palaprat (May 1650 – 14 October 1721), was a French lawyer and playwright.

Palaprat was born in Toulouse. He mostly co-authored plays with David-Augustin de Brueys; many were premièred at the Comédie-Française and Théâtre-Français in Paris. Their plays were published posthumously in Les Œuvres de théâtre de Messieurs Brueys et de Palaprat in 1755.  Palaprat died in Paris.

References

External links
Brueys and Palaprat at the International League of Antiquarian Booksellers
Brueys und Palaprat und ihre dramatischen Werke 
"Le Grondeur"

Writers from Toulouse
1650 births
1721 deaths
17th-century French lawyers
17th-century French dramatists and playwrights
17th-century French male writers